Carlina biebersteinii is a purple-flowered herb in the tribe Cardueae of the family Asteraceae. It is found in Europe, Russia, Kazakhstan and in the Xinjiang region of China. It grows in dry meadows and thickets.

Carlina biebersteinii  Bernh. ex Hornem., Suppl. Hort. Bot. Hafn. 94. 1819.

Subspecies:
 Carlina biebersteinii var. fennica Meusel & Kästner (synonym: Carlina fennica (Meusel & Kästner) Tzvelev)

Gallery

References

biebersteinii
Flora of China
Flora of Xinjiang
Flora of Russia
Flora of Kazakhstan
Flora of Europe
Plants described in 1819